Pedro Aguirrebeña (1 July 1917 – 6 November 2009) was a Chilean water polo player. He competed in the 1948 Summer Olympics. His older brother Luis was also a water polo player.

References

1917 births
2009 deaths
Water polo players at the 1948 Summer Olympics
Sportspeople from Santiago
Chilean male water polo players
Olympic water polo players of Chile